Mami is a popular Filipino noodle soup made with wheat flour noodles, broth and the addition of meat (chicken, beef, pork) or  wonton dumplings. It is related to the pancit class of noodle dishes, and the noodles themselves are sometimes called pancit mami.

Origin
Its creation is generally attributed to Ma Mon Luk, a Chinese immigrant to the Philippines who began selling noodles served with chicken broth and chicken meat in Binondo, Manila in 1920. He originally worked as an ambulant vendor, carrying the food in two metal vats on a pole much like taho vendors. Thus, mami was originally street food, but with the success of his business, Ma eventually opened up an eatery and ultimately a chain of restaurants bearing his name. As a street vendor, Ma originally called his dish "gupit", after the Tagalog word for “cut”, because he would cut the noodles and chicken with scissors. He later decided to call the dish "Ma mi". However, Ma did not have the name trademarked. Soon, imitation noodle soups sprouted with a name that was, personally, his.

However, the claim that Ma invented the mami, which originates from the media company ABS-CBN, is likely untrue. According to linguist Gloria Chan-Yap, mami is Fujianese in origin, not Cantonese; in Philippine Hokkien literally means "meat noodles". Like the siopao, the noodle dish already existed in Filipino-Chinese cuisine before Ma popularized his version.

See also
Batchoy 
Maki mi
List of noodle dishes
List of soups
Ramen
Wonton noodles

References

Philippine soups
Pancit